Coatsville is an unincorporated community in northern Schuyler County, Missouri. It is located on Route 202, approximately six miles northwest of Lancaster on the Iowa state line. The community is part of the Kirksville micropolitan area. 

Coatsville was platted in 1869. A post office called Coatsville has been in operation since 1869.

References

Unincorporated communities in Schuyler County, Missouri
Kirksville micropolitan area, Missouri
Unincorporated communities in Missouri